The Denver Pioneers men's soccer team represents the University of Denver in NCAA Division I men's soccer competitions. The Pioneers compete in The Summit League.

Seasons

Team management

Head coaching history 

Over the program's history, there have been 11 different head coaches.

References

External links 
 

 
Soccer clubs in Denver
1961 establishments in Colorado
Association football clubs established in 1961